Beifang Town is a town located on the southeastern portion of Huairou District, Beijing, China. It shares border with Huaibei and Xitiangezhuang Towns to its north, Shilibao and Henanzhai Towns to its east, Mulin and Yangsong Towns to its south, and Huairou Town to its west. Its population was 33,712 as of 2020. Its name Beifang literally means "North House".

History

Administrative divisions 
As of the year 2021, Beifang Town consisted of 18 subdivisions — 2 communities and 16 villages:

See also 

 List of township-level divisions of Beijing

References 

Huairou District
Towns in Beijing